XHUDEM-FM is a radio station serving Monterrey, Nuevo León. It is owned by the Universidad de Monterrey and broadcasts on 90.5 FM from its campus in San Pedro Garza García.

History
XHUMY-FM was permitted on February 11, 1994 and had an effective radiated power of 10 watts. The university changed the callsign to XHUDM-FM in 1996 and to the current XHUDEM-FM in 2000.

References

Spanish-language radio stations
Radio stations in Monterrey
University radio stations in Mexico
Radio stations established in 1994
1994 establishments in Mexico